The Umhlametsi Game Reserve is a game reserve located next to Kruger National Park, in the Limpopo province of South Africa.

Wildlife 
Wildlife species include lion, southern white rhino, African buffalo, leopard and cheetah.

See also 
 Protected areas of South Africa

Nature reserves in South Africa